Léon-Benoît-Alfred Charlebois (February 18, 1842 – June 27, 1887) was a grain merchant and political figure in Quebec. He represented Laprairie in the Legislative Assembly of Quebec from 1875 to 1887 as a Conservative.

He was born in La Prairie, Canada East, the son of Benoît Charlebois and Madeleine David, and was educated there. Charlebois was president of the Turnpike Road Trust. In 1868, he married Marie Elmire, daughter of Jean-Baptiste Varin. He served as auditor and then served on the municipal council for La Prairie. Charlebois died in office in La Prairie at the age of 45.

References
 

1842 births
1887 deaths
Conservative Party of Quebec MNAs
People from La Prairie, Quebec